was the Minister of Finance of Japan between 1941 and 1944. He advocated financing the Second World War and decreasing Chinese resistance by selling opiates to the Chinese. In 1945, he was captured by the Allies, tried by the International Military Tribunal for the Far East and sentenced to life imprisonment. Paroled in 1955, he later served as Minister of Justice from 1963 until 1964.

In Kaya's obituary, Time magazine quoted him as saying that communism means only a dog's life.

References 

|-

|-

|-

|-

External links 
 "Bitter Fruit"
 Okinori Kaya profile

1889 births
1977 deaths
Members of the House of Peers (Japan)
Japanese people convicted of war crimes
Japanese people of World War II
People convicted by the International Military Tribunal for the Far East
Ministers of Finance of Japan
Ministers of Justice of Japan
Japanese anti-communists
Japanese politicians convicted of crimes
Japanese fascists

Prisoners sentenced to life imprisonment by international courts and tribunals